Błażejewo may refer to the following places:
Błażejewo, Poznań County in Greater Poland Voivodeship (west-central Poland)
Błażejewo, Śrem County in Greater Poland Voivodeship (west-central Poland)
Błażejewo, Warmian-Masurian Voivodeship (north Poland)